An adnexal mass is a lump in tissue of the adnexa of uterus (structures closely related structurally and functionally to the uterus such as the ovaries, fallopian tubes, or any of the surrounding connective tissue). Adnexal masses can be benign or cancerous, and they can be categorized as simple or complex. One of the most important factors used to determine the clinical suspicion of malignancy of an adnexal mass is the sonographic appearance of the mass. Indications that the mass is at a higher risk of being malignant include the presence of loculations, nodules, papillary structures, or septations or a size greater than 10 cm.

Causes
In premenopausal women, adnexal masses include ovarian cysts, ectopic (tubal) pregnancies, benign (noncancerous) or malignant (cancerous) tumors, endometriomas, polycystic ovaries, and tubo-ovarian abscess. The most common causes for adnexal masses in premenopausal women include follicular cysts and corpus luteum cysts. Abscesses can form as a complication of pelvic inflammatory disease.

In postmenopausal women, adnexal masses may be caused by cancer, fibroids, fibromas, or diverticular abscesses.

Diagnosis

Treatment

Removal is sometimes referred to as "adnexectomy".

References

External links 

 Adnexal mass entry in the public domain NCI Dictionary of Cancer Terms
  Emedicine overview

Benign neoplasms